The Victorian Institute of Teaching (VIT) is an independent statutory authority whose task is to recognise and regulate members of the teaching profession in Victoria, Australia,.  The Institute registers teachers working in all schools in Victoria.

See also
Teaching in Victoria
Education in Victoria
Department of Education and Early Childhood Development
 Quango

References

External links 
Victorian Institute of Teaching website
Department of Education and Early Childhood Development, Victoria website

Education in Victoria (Australia)
Teaching in Australia